Josh Smith is a former professional rugby league footballer who played in the 2000s. He played for the Northern Eagles in 2000 and the Newcastle Knights in 2003. Having won the 2001 NRL Premiership, the Knights traveled to England to play the 2002 World Club Challenge against Super League champions, the Bradford Bulls. Smith played on the wing and scored a try in Newcastle's loss.

References

External links
http://www.rugbyleagueproject.org/players/Joshua_Smith/summary.html

Australian rugby league players
Northern Eagles players
Newcastle Knights players
Living peoplenin)imijj

1979 births
Place of birth missing (living people)
Rugby articles needing expert attention
Rugby league wingers